Fran Moore is an American who formerly served as a Central Intelligence Agency executive. Her positions at the agency included Director of Analysis from 2010 to 2014, Deputy Director of Intelligence, Deputy Director of Analytic Programs, Director and Deputy Director of Terrorism Analysis in the Counterterrorism Center and Chief, Deputy Chief of Counterintelligence Analysis.

She has been repeatedly mistaken for then-nominee for Director of the Central Intelligence Agency Gina Haspel by a number of notable news sources.

References

External links

People of the Central Intelligence Agency
Living people
Year of birth missing (living people)